Kenneth Mills Regan (March 6, 1891 – August 15, 1959) was an American businessman, World War I veteran, and politician who served four terms as a U.S. Representative from Texas from 1947 to 1955.

Early life and career
Born in Mount Morris, Illinois, Regan attended the public schools and Vincennes (Indiana) University. Regan served as a flyer in the United States Army Signal Corps during World War I.

In 1920, Regan was involved in the real estate business and as an oil operator in Pecos, Texas. He served on the Pecos City Council and as mayor of Pecos 1929-1932. He served in the Texas Senate from 1933 to 1937.

World War I
During World War I, he served as an intelligence officer in the Air Corps and was discharged with the rank of captain.

After the war, moved to Midland, Texas, and continued oil operations.

Political career
Regan was elected as a Democrat to the Eightieth Congress to fill the vacancy caused by the resignation of Robert Ewing Thomason. He was reelected to the Eighty-first, Eighty-second, and Eighty-third Congresses, and served from August 23, 1947, to January 3, 1955.
Regan was an unsuccessful candidate for renomination in 1954 to the Eighty-fourth Congress.

Later career and death 
Regan later served as the representative of Texas railroads in Washington, D.C.

He died in Santa Fe, New Mexico, on August 15, 1959. He was interred in Resthaven Memorial Park, Midland, Texas.

References

Sources

1891 births
1959 deaths
United States Army Air Forces officers
Democratic Party Texas state senators
Democratic Party members of the United States House of Representatives from Texas
Mayors of places in Texas
20th-century American politicians
People from Mount Morris, Illinois
People from Pecos, Texas
Military personnel from Illinois
Vincennes University alumni
Military personnel from Texas